Emilio Bataclan is a Roman Catholic Bishop in the Philippines. He is an Auxiliary Bishop-Emeritus of Cebu. He is currently residing in his residence in San Remigio, Cebu. He is also the first bishop from Bantayan, Cebu followed by Archbishop John F. Du. He resigned as auxiliary bishop of Cebu on 1 October 2015 after serving the archdiocese for more than 11 years and received the honorary title of "Auxiliary Bishop-Emeritus of Cebu". His last post is from the Parish of San Fernando el Rey in Liloan, Cebu. He also worked with the Servant of God Archbishop Teofilo Camomot when they were assigned both as priests to the Parish of Saint Thomas of Villanova in El Pardo, Cebu City.

Biography 
Emilio Bataclan was born on 20 September 1940 in Bantayan, Cebu. He was ordained priest on 1 May 1966 in the Cebu Metropolitan Cathedral. From 1972 to 1995, he served as parish priest of Daanbantayan, Bantayan Island, Alang-Alang, Mandaue, Bogo and San Nicolas. He was appointed Auxiliary Bishop of Cebu and was consecrated on 19 April 1990 in the Cebu Metropolitan Cathedral by Cebu Archbishop Ricardo Cardinal Vidal. He was also appointed Bishop of Iligan and Titular Bishop of Septimunicia and Gunela. He was appointed again to be the auxiliary bishop of Cebu on 21 June 2004. He resigned as auxiliary bishop of Cebu on 1 October 2015 due to medical reasons after passing the mandatory age of retirement at 75. He is currently living in his retirement house in San Remigio, Cebu.

Career 
Emilio Bataclan felt the call to priesthood. He traveled from his native home to Cebu City to study Theology in the Seminario Mayor de San Carlos. He was Ordained a priest on 1 May 1966. His first assignment as priest is to the Parish of Saints Peter and Paul in his hometown, Bantayan Island. He was appointed by Ricardo Vidal, the archbishop of Cebu at that time, to be the auxiliary bishop of Cebu. He gladly accepted it. He was consecrated as bishop on 19 April 1990 by Ricardo Cardinal Vidal. He served the archdiocese after he was transferred as Bishop of Iligan. He was also appointed as Titular Bishop of Septimunicia and Gunela. He was then appointed again by Arch. Ricardo Cardinal Vidal as the auxiliary bishop of Cebu for the second time. He was installed on 21 June 2004.

Retirement 
After 11 years as auxiliary bishop of Cebu, he resigned on 2015 due to health reasons after reaching the mandatory age of retirement at 75. He celebrated his retirement mass at the Cebu Metropolitan Cathedral on 1 October 2015 at 4:00 PM (Philippine Time). In response to his retirement, Pope Francis named two priests to succeed him. They were Dennis Villarojo and Oscar Jaime Llaneta Florencio. He is currently living in his retirement house in San Remigio, Cebu.

Following the death of Ricardo Cardinal Vidal, whom he had served as auxiliary bishop, on 18 October 2017 he celebrated the third requiem mass at the Cebu Metropolitan Cathedral.

References 

1940 births
Living people
21st-century Roman Catholic bishops in the Philippines
Roman Catholic bishops of Cebu